The Cockcroft Institute is an international centre for Accelerator Science and Technology (AST) in the UK. It was proposed in September 2003 and officially opened in September 2006. It is a joint venture of Lancaster University, the University of Liverpool, the University of Manchester, the University of Strathclyde, the Science and Technology Facilities Council, and the Northwest Regional Development Agency. The Institute is located in a purpose-built building on the Sci-Tech Daresbury campus, and in centres in each of the participating universities.

The Institute's aim is to provide the intellectual focus, educational infrastructure, and the essential scientific and technological facilities for Accelerator Science and Technology research and development, which will enable UK scientists and engineers to take a major role in accelerator design, construction, and operation for the foreseeable future. The Institute is named after the Nobel prizewinner Sir John Cockcroft FRS.

The present director of the Cockcroft Institute is Peter Ratoff, who replaced the previous directors Swapan Chattopadhyay and John Dainton.

References

External links 
 The Cockcroft Institute website
 The Cockcroft Institute at Sci-Tech Daresbury

College and university associations and consortia in the United Kingdom
Research institutes in Cheshire
Physics institutes
Science and Technology Facilities Council